Luke Weaver is the name of:

Luke Weaver (baseball)
Luke Weaver (footballer)